The Owl (German: Die Eule) is a 1927 German thriller film directed by and starring Eddie Polo. It was released in two parts.

The film's sets were designed by Fritz Willi Krohn.

Cast
 Eddie Polo as Jack Clifford  
 Erich Kaiser-Titz as O'Brian  
 Hans Adalbert Schlettow 
 Fritz Schnell as Henry Hogan  
 Dorothy Douglas as Alice Hogan

References

Bibliography
 Alfred Krautz. International directory of cinematographers, set- and costume designers in film, Volume 4. Saur, 1984.

External links

1927 films
Films of the Weimar Republic
German silent feature films
Films directed by Eddie Polo
German black-and-white films
1920s thriller films
German thriller films
Silent thriller films
1920s German films